Kevin Patrick Sean Corby (23 November 1928 – 14 September 2006) was an Australian politician in Tasmania.

In 1972 he was elected to the Tasmanian House of Assembly as a Labor member for Denison. He served until his resignation two years later in 1974.

References

2006 deaths
Members of the Tasmanian House of Assembly
Australian Labor Party members of the Parliament of Tasmania
1928 births